Buckhorn Reservoir is a reservoir in Wilson County, North Carolina, USA, created by the Buckhorn Dam. The reservoir is the primary water supply for the city of Wilson. The reservoir at that time only had the ability to contain  of water. In 1999, a new dam was constructed downstream from the older dam creating a reservoir with a much larger capacity.

The dam is one-half mile long and was built with expansion in mind. The dam is capable of holding another  of water, but that would require changes to the spillway design. A drought in 2007 caused the reservoir to drop to the 60% capacity level, which has raised the issue of increasing the capacity of the lake.

The reservoir is fed by two streams, Turkey Creek and Moccasin Creek. Water to be treated is not drawn from the reservoir itself. The outflow travels down Contentnea Creek to the Wiggins Mill reservoir, where the water is treated at the Wiggins Mill Water Treatment Plant.

References

Protected areas of Wilson County, North Carolina
Reservoirs in North Carolina
Bodies of water of Wilson County, North Carolina